Delta Psi Sigma, is a United States-based multicultural, inter-collegiate sorority founded on January 14, 2001. Commonly known as DYS or Deltas, the sorority has been expanding to 3 different locations: New York, New Jersey, and Massachusetts.

History
Delta Psi Sigma was established in New York, New York on January 14, 2001. There were five founding sisters: Danna Chang, Kate Chen, Melissa D’Souza, Annie Park, and Michelle Tang. These five founding sisters originated from Buffalo University, Hofstra University, Manhattan College, and New York University, and had a goal to establish a sisterhood to unite sisters from different cultural backgrounds.

Philanthropy
Delta Psi Sigma's national philanthropies are March of Dimes and Convoy of Hope.

Since the founding of the sorority, Delta Psi Sigma Sorority’s national philanthropy has been March of Dimes. Since the chartering of Delta Psi Sigma’s Boston Chapter, community services have been provided with the purpose to advance March of Dimes’ ‘March for Babies Walk’ every year.

Convoy of Hope has been Delta Psi Sigma Sorority’s national philanthropy since 2017. Across all chapters, the sorority holds events and fundraisers to show its strong support for Convoy of Hope. The money raised goes towards engaging the community, nourishing children, growing crops, responding to disasters, and partnering with like-minded organizations.

Chapters
Delta Psi Sigma is a growing sorority and currently has 4 chapters in different cities:

Notable alumni
 Jessica Tam, owner of Eggloo 
 Amy Hsiao, founder and CEO of Simple Spoons, Kitsby

References

External Links
 National Website
 New York Chapter Website
 Boston Chapter Website

Fraternities and sororities in the United States
Student societies in the United States
2001 establishments in New York City
Student organizations established in 2001